Inés Ferrer Suárez and Sara Sorribes Tormo were the defending champions, but both players chose not to participate.

María Irigoyen and Barbora Krejčíková won the title, defeating Laura Siegemund and Renata Voráčová in the final, 6–4, 6–2.

Seeds

Draw

References 
 Draw

2015 ITF Women's Circuit